Pinocchio in Outer Space is a 1965 Belgian-American animated science-fantasy film which sets Carlo Collodi's Pinocchio character on a rocketship adventure. Peter Lazer performs the voice of Pinocchio. It was produced by Ray Goossens at Belvision Studios, with American involvement from Norm Prescott (Filmation) and Fred Ladd. The film was released in the US by Universal Pictures.

The French version was titled Pinocchio dans l'espace and the Dutch version was known as Pinocchio in de ruimte.

The Talking Cricket character was not present in this production. Instead, Pinocchio's sidekick was Nurtle, an alien Twertle (voiced by Arnold Stang), sent by his government to investigate an unusual increase of radiation on Mars. Together they do battle against Astro, a marauding intergalactic whale who was seeking revenge after being abducted by a mysterious race of Martians.

Cast
 Peter Lazer – Pinocchio
 Arnold Stang – Nurtle the Twurtle
 Ray Owens – Mister Geppetto
 Conrad Jameson –  G. Godline/Sharp
 Mavis Mims – The Blue Fairy
 Jess Cain – Groovy
 Minerva Pious – The Blue Fairy's Mother
 Norman Rose – Fedora
 Kevin Kennedy – Astro the Space Whale

Comic strip adaptation

In 1965 the film was adapted into a comic strip by Willy Lateste, which was published in Tintin.

See also
List of American films of 1965

List of animated feature-length films

References

External links
 
Rotten Tomatoes: Pinocchio in Outer Space
Bad Movie Planet: Pinocchio in Outer Space
Flanders Image listing: Pinocchio in Outer Space

1965 films
1965 animated films
1960s American animated films
1960s science fiction films
American animated science fiction films
Belgian animated science fiction films
1960s English-language films
1960s French-language films
Pinocchio films
American space adventure films
Mars in film
Universal Pictures animated films
Universal Pictures films
Animated films based on children's books
Animated films about extraterrestrial life
Films adapted into comics
Films directed by Ray Goossens
French-language Belgian films